The 1994 Stuttgart Indoor, also known as the Eurocard Open for sponsorship reasons, was a men's ATP tennis tournament played on indoor carpet courts at the Hanns-Martin-Schleyer-Halle in Stuttgart, Germany. It was the fifth edition of the tournament and was held from 14 February until 20 February 1994. Third-seeded Stefan Edberg won the singles title, his second at the event after 1991.

Finals

Singles

 Stefan Edberg defeated  Goran Ivanišević, 4–6, 6–4, 6–2, 6–-2
 It was Edberg's 2nd singles title of the year and 39th of his career.

Doubles

 David Adams /  Andrei Olhovskiy defeated  Grant Connell /  Patrick Galbraith, 6–7, 6–4, 7–6

References

External links
 ITF tournament edition details

1994 ATP Tour
1994 Eurocard Open
1994 in German tennis